The Ferrocarril del Pacífico is a former railroad line of Mexico that operated from Nogales, Sonora to Guadalajara, Jalisco via Mazatlán, Sinaloa. 

It ran passenger trains between these points: El Yaqui and Mexicali, Nogales, Sonora -- Guadalajara, Jalisco via Benjamín Hill, Sonora and Mazatlán, Sinaloa; and shorter routes: Mazatlán - Naco and Guadalajara - San Marcos.

It was absorbed into Ferrocarriles Nacionales de México in 1984.

See also 
List of Mexican railroads
Ferrocarriles Nacionales de Mexico
Southern Pacific Railroad
Ferrocarril Sonora-Baja California
Ferrocarril Chihuahua al Pacifico
Ferromex

References

External links 

Pacifico
Ferrocarriles Nacionales de México
Railway companies established in 1950
1984 disestablishments in Mexico
Railway companies disestablished in 1984
Mexican companies established in 1950